Nušl  is an impact crater that is located on the far side of the Moon. It lies just to the north of the crater Trumpler, and to the west of Shayn.

Diameter of the crater is 61 km. Its mean depth is about 3.8 km, but the full range of heights (from the lowest point of the floor to the highest point of the rim) reaches 5.2 km.

Age of this crater is estimated as Late Imbrian. It has a slightly eroded rim, and still possesses some terrace or ledge structures along the inner wall. A small crater is attached to the exterior rim along the east-northeast. The interior floor is relatively level, with an elongated central peak near the midpoint. Nušl contains only small craterlets, the biggest being about 1.5 km. It has no lava, rilles, or ray system.

Satellite craters
By convention these features are identified on lunar maps by placing the letter on the side of the crater midpoint that is closest to Nušl.

References

Sources

External links
 Digital Lunar Orbiter Photo Number V-079-H1
 Part of the crater. Its central peak is seen in the middle. Image by LRO with resolution 1.6 m/pixel; the width is about 8.0 km.

Impact craters on the Moon
Imbrian